Jambo is a gorilla who used to reside at Jersey Zoo.

Jambo may also refer to:

Music
 "Jambo" (The Adventure song), the official song of the 21st World Scout Jamboree
 "Jambo" (Takagi & Ketra song), 2019 song featuring Omi and Giusy Ferreri
 Jambo (album), a 1992 album by Osibisa
 Jambo, a band that includes Melinda McGraw and family members

Other uses
 Jambo (greeting), a Swahili greeting
 Jambo Bukoba, a charity in Germany with strong links to Tanzania
 Jambo (card game), a card game from Germany
 Jambo Creek, a right tributary of the East Twin River, Wisconsin, US
 Jacques Vieau was called Jambo by Native Americans. Jambo Creek is named after him
 Jambo (TV series), a 1969-71 U.S. TV series by Ivan Tors
 Jambo, a slang word for a supporter or player of Heart of Midlothian F.C.
 Jambo OpenOffice, the first office suite in Swahili, based on OpenOffice.org
 Jambo Bolton, a fictional character in the British soap opera Hollyoaks

People with the surname
 Suzanne Jambo, South Sudanese politician

See also
 "Jambo Bwana", a 1982 Swahili song composed by Kenyan musician Teddy Kalanda Harrison